Egil Sten Abel (18 November 1899 – 30 December 1989) was a Norwegian sailor who competed in the 1920 Summer Olympics. He was a crew member of the Norwegian boat Fornebo, which won the silver medal in the 7 metre class.

Abel was a reserve officer in the Norwegian Army. During the Norwegian campaign, he was placed in the command of a group of volunteers dubbed ‘Abel’s Ski Company’. The group was disbanded after Norway’s surrender, and Abel was taken in as a prisoner of war from 1940-1941.

References

External links
 
 
 

1899 births
1989 deaths
Norwegian male sailors (sport)
Sailors at the 1920 Summer Olympics – 7 Metre
Olympic sailors of Norway
Olympic silver medalists for Norway
Olympic medalists in sailing
Norwegian Army personnel of World War II
Medalists at the 1920 Summer Olympics